In human mitochondrial genetics, Haplogroup M8 is a human mitochondrial DNA (mtDNA) haplogroup.

Origin
Haplogroup M8 is a descendant of haplogroup M. Haplogroup M8 is divided into subclades M8a, C and Z.

Distribution
It is an East Asian haplogroup. Today, haplogroup M8 is found at its highest frequency in indigenous populations of East Siberia such as Evenk and Yukaghir. Haplogroup M8 is one of the most common mtDNA haplogroups among Yakut, Tuvan. Haplogroup C, the most major one of three subclades is highly distributed among the Amerindian and Indigienous peoples of East Siberia. Haplogroup Z, the other one of three subclades is highly distributed among Even from Kamchatka (8/39 Z1a2a, 3/39 Z1a3, 11/39 = 28.2% Z total), mtDNA Haplogroup M8a, not well known one of three subclades is highly distributed among Northern Han Chinese from Liaoning (16/317 = 5.0%).

Table of Frequencies by ethnic group

Subclades
Haplogroup C, the most major one of three subclades is highly distributed among the Amerindian and Indigienous peoples of East Siberia. Haplogroup Z, the other one of three subclades is highly distributed among Even from Kamchatka (8/39 Z1a2a, 3/39 Z1a3, 11/39 = 28.2% Z total), mtDNA Haplogroup M8a, not well known one of three subclades is highly distributed among Northern Han Chinese from Liaoning (16/317 = 5.0%).

Tree
This phylogenetic tree of haplogroup M8 subclades is based on the paper by Mannis van Oven and Manfred Kayser Updated comprehensive phylogenetic tree of global human mitochondrial DNA variation and subsequent published research.

M8
M8a
M8a1 - Ulch
M8a1a - Japanese
M8a2'3
M8a2 - Japanese, Han Chinese
M8a2-a* - Japanese,Russia
M8a2a'b (T152C!) - Japanese
M8a2a - Han Chinese
M8a2a1 - Japanese, Han Chinese(Hunan)
M8a2a1a1
M8a2a1b
M8a2a1c - Japanese
M8a2b - Japanese,Han Chinese(Shandong)
M8a2b1
M8a2b2 - Russia
M8a2c - Japanese, Han Chinese
M8a2d - Han Chinese 
M8a2e - Ami(Taiwan Aborigines),Han Chinese(Taiwan)
M8a3 - Japanese, Han Chinese
M8a3a - Han Chinese
M8a3a1 - Han Chinese
CZ
C
C1
C1a - Ulch, Swedish
C1b - Amerindian
C1b1
C1b2
C1b3
C1b4
C1b5
C1b5a
C1b5b
C1b6
C1b7'10 (T16311C!)
C1b7
C1b7a
C1b10
C1b8
C1b9
C1b11
C1b12
C1b13
C1b13a
C1b13a1
C1b13b
C1b13c
C1b13c1
C1b13d
C1b13e
C1b14
C1c - Amerindian
C1c1
C1c1a
C1c1b
C1c2
C1c3
C1c4
C1c5
C1c6'7
C1c6
C1c7
C1c8
C1d - Amerindian
C1d1
C1d1a
C1d1a1
C1d1b
C1d1b1
C1d1c
C1d1c1
C1d1d
C1d2
C1d2a
C1d3
C1e - Amerindian
C1f - Amerindian
C4 - Siberian, Mongolian, Han Chinese
C4a'b'c
C4a
C4a1
C4a1a
C4a1a1
C4a1a1a
C4a1a2'3'4
C4a1a2
C4a1a2a
C4a1a3
C4a1a3a
C4a1a3a1
C4a1a3b
C4a1a3c
C4a1a3d
C4a1a4
C4a1a4a
C4a1a5
C4a1a6
C4a2
C4a2a
C4a2a1
C4a2a1a
C4a2a1b
C4a2b
C4a2b1
C4a2b2
C4a2b2a
C4a2c
C4a2c1
C4a2c2
C4a2c2a
C4b
C4b1
C4b1a
C4b1b
C4b2
C4b2a
C4b3
C4b3a
C4b3a1
C4b3b
C4b5
C4b6
C4b7
C4b8
C4b8a
C4c
C4c1
C4c1a
C4c1b
C4c2
C4d'e
C4d
C4e
C5 - Siberian, Mongolian, Han Chinese
C5a
C5a1
C5a2
C5a2a
C5a2b
C5a2b1
C5b
C5b1
C5b1a
C5b1a1
C5b1b
C5b1b1
C5c'd
C5c
C5c1
C5c1a
C5d
C5d1
C5d2
C7 - Han Chinese, Indo-China Penisulan
C7a
C7a1
C7a1a
C7a1a1
C7a1a2
C7a1c
C7a1d
C7a2
C7a2a
C7b
Z
Z1'2'3'4'7
Z1 - Tofalar
Z1a - Tubalar
Z1a1
Z1a1a - Saami, Kets
Z1a1b - Nganasan, Estonian
Z1a2 - Ulch
Z1a2a - Nivkh
Z1a3 - Yakuts, Estonian
Z2 - Japanese
Z3 - Japanese
Z3a
Z3a1
Z3a1a - Han Chinese, Indian
Z3a2 - Indian
Z3b - Indian
Z3c - Persian(Iranian), Japanese
Z3d - Han Chinese, Taiwanese
Z4 - Han Chinese
Z4a - Japanese
Z4a1 - Han Chinese
Z4a1a
Z4a1a1 - Japanese
Z7 - Indian
Z5 - Japanese

See also

Genealogical DNA test
Genetic Genealogy
Human mitochondrial genetics
Population Genetics
Human mitochondrial DNA haplogroups
Indigenous American genetic studies

References

Bibliography

External links
General
47z TAT's blog
Ian Logan's Mitochondrial DNA Site 
Mannis van Oven's Phylotree
Haplogroup C
Spread of Haplogroup C, from National Geographic

M8
Bioinformatics